The second season of the Albanian competitive reality television series Hell's Kitchen Albania premiered on October 11, 2019 on Top Channel. Renato Mekolli returned as host and head chef. Contestant from season 1, Ani Alku and contestant from MasterChef Albania, Albana Dulellari became the sous chefs for the Red Team and Blue Team respectively. This year maitre d' was Juljan Mata.

On January 10, 2020, chef Renato announced Françesko Tuku as the winner.

Chefs

Contestant progress

Team captains

 The red team decide the captain for the blue team and the blue team decide the captain for the red team.

 Chef Renato decide the captains.

 Each team select their captains.

References

External links

2019 Albanian television seasons
2020 Albanian television seasons
Hell's Kitchen (TV series)